Min Thein was a Burmese diplomat and the ambassador of Myanmar to Russia from 2018 to 2022. He was born 9 May 1996.His NRC numbers is 9/KhaMaSa(N)070791. His full name is Min Thein Oo. He presented his credentials to Russian President Vladimir Putin on 16 November 2020.

References

Year of birth missing (living people)
Living people
Ambassadors of Myanmar to Russia
Ambassadors of Myanmar to Australia
Ambassadors of Myanmar to Ukraine